Fernanda Loreto Urrejola Arroyo (born September 24, 1981) is a Chilean television, theatre and film actress.

The daughter of Francisco Urrejola and Francisca Arroyo, she has three sisters, Alejandra, Francisca and Isidora. She studied at the Kent School in Providencia, Santiago and later Escenic communication in Duoc UC. She started her acting career in the young telenovela Destinos Cruzados.

Fernanda Urrejola's first movie appearance was in Perjudícame Cariño. She played a popular character in the telenovela Corazón de María as the Néstor Cantillana's wife. She also participated in Hijos del Monte. She is bisexual.

Since relocating to Los Angeles, California, in 2016, she has appeared in major productions such as Narcos: Mexico, or Cry Macho sharing credits with Clint Eastwood. In 2023 she appeared as character Dolores De La Cruz on HBO Max's Gossip Girl reboot.

Filmography

Film

 El roto (Perjudícame cariño) (2004)
 Bienvenida realidad (2004) - Marina
 My Best Enemy (2005) - Gloria
 Drama (2010) - Mother of Mateo
 Metro cuadrado (2011) - Romina
 Bring Me the Head of the Machine Gun Woman (2012) - La Mujer Metralleta
 Gritos del bosque (2014) - Ailén Catrilaf
 No estoy loca (2018) - Maite
 American huaso (2018)
 Imprisoned  (2018) - Lisa
 After Her (2019) - Gabriela
 Cry Macho (2021)
 Blue Miracle (2021)

TV

Telenovelas

 16 (2003, TVN) - Matilde Arias
 Destinos Cruzados (2004, TVN) - Pascuala Goycolea
 17 (2005, TVN) - Matilde Arias
 Versus (2005, TVN) - Clarita Chaparro
 Floribella (2006, TVN) - Sofía Santillán
 Corazón de Maria (2007, TVN) - María Cofré
 Amor por accidente (2007, TVN) - Romina Urrutia
 Hijos del Monte (2008, TVN) - Beatriz Pereira
 Mujeres de Lujo (2010, Chilevisión) - Magdalena Reyes / Esmeralda Martín
 La Doña (2011, Chilevisión) - Millaray Lisperguer
 Graduados (2013, Chilevisión) - María Laura "Loli" Falsetti
 Chipe Libre (2015, Canal 13)
 20añero a los 40 (2016, Canal 13)

Series

 La Vida es una lotería (2003, TVN) - Patty
 Bienvenida Realidad (2004, TVN) - Marina
 JPT: Justicia para todos (2005, TVN) - Mónica Ríos
 Gen Mishima (2008, TVN) - Amapola Benadente
 Adiós la Séptimo de Línea (2010, Megavisión) - Leonora Latorre	
 Karma (2011, Chilevisión) - Juliet
 Narcos: Mexico (2018, Netflix) - María Elvira
 Party of Five (2020, Freeform) - Gloria
  Gossip Girl (2023, HBO Max) - Dolores De La Cruz

Theatre
 El Inspector (2005)
 Cuentos para un invierno largo (2006)
 Patio (2009)

References

External links
 
 Especial Fotográfico de Fernanda Urrejola en TVN

1981 births
Living people
People from Santiago
Chilean people of Basque descent
Chilean people of Spanish descent
Chilean film actresses
Chilean television actresses
Chilean telenovela actresses
Chilean LGBT actors
Chilean bisexual people